Boris Alexandrovitch Chetkov (27 October 1926–6 September 2010) was a Russian painter and glass artist known for his vivid works which range across genres but can be loosely aligned with Expressionism, Abstract Expressionism and Figurative Expressionism. His theories on art and use of colour also align him broadly with Modernism and Kandinsky though in his painting he worked largely in isolation from his peers and remained disconnected from the international art community until the end of Communism. He was a member of the Saint Petersburg Union of Artists.

Despite a difficult early life and an almost total lack of recognition from the art establishment of the Soviet Union, Chetkov was a hugely experimental painter until his death. He had an almost obsessive urge to create: for example in the early 1990s alone he painted more than 400 pieces.  Both his paint and glass works are notable for their evocative, idiosyncratic and sophisticated use of colour, which built in intensity through three distinct periods of artistic development.

Chetkov's work can be found in private collections around the world as well as in the Hermitage Museum and the State Russian Museum in St Petersburg. His was the opening exhibition for Russian Art Week in 2013.

Life

Chetkov was born into a well-off peasant family in Novaya Lyalya, Sverdlovsk Oblast in 1926. In the 1930s his family were forced to give up their land during collectivisation, and for several years he travelled with his parents around various collective farms and factories in the Urals as they looked for work. In 1942, aged 16, Chetkov was arrested for 'hooliganism' and placed in the Gulag system, ending up at the penal colony near Nizhny Tagil, the same one at which Armin Stromberg was interred, at about the same time. In 1944 he was conscripted into a tank regiment in the Russian army and saw action in Latvia during the Courland Pocket blockade at the end of World War II.

Chetkov was a talented and focused artist from childhood but did not receive any formal art education until 1949-1952 when he studied under art historian Vladimir Eifert, one-time Director of the Pushkin Museum, who had been exiled to Karaganda in 1941

Chetkov then studied at the Tavricheskaya Art School from 1952/3-1954, but did not graduate as he contracted brucellosis and nearly died, an experience that strengthened his resolve to become an artist. After his recovery he studied at the Stroganov Moscow State University of Arts and Industry (1960-1965), where he was taught by Sergey Gerasimov. He was forced to leave the university after his frank views in western art and artistic freedom incurred the wrath of Communist party members. He transferred to, and graduated from, Saint Petersburg State Art and Industry Academy in 1966.

Chetkov was Chief Glass Artist of the First Communist Volunteer Corps 1BBW (1КДО) Glass Factory in Malaya Vishera from 1967-1979. Chetkov was a highly creative and passionate glass artist who developed the factory's output and frequently experimented with different finishes and techniques, including Venetian techniques. He stated, "Working with glass is enchanting, it carries you away, liberates your fantasy; the artist becomes a magician when he creates an object from a shapeless hot paste… Glass gave fire to my soul, and it left a deep burn in it.". His art glass was exhibited around the world from the 1970s onwards, but under the umbrella of ‘artist of the Soviet Union’ rather than under his own name.

Works in paint

For most of his artistic life Chetkov painted in isolation as his work did not conform with Communist-approved Socialist Realism. However, despite difficult early experiences and an almost total lack of recognition, he never lost his "irrepressible strength of spirit", and it comes across in his paintings, which are for the most part vivid in palette and vital in execution. He returned to certain genres again and again: still life, landscape, equine art, abstract expressionism, portraiture and music, continuously experimenting with new colour palettes and media. Chetkov was also influenced by nostalgia for his early childhood experiences on his grandfather's farm, frequently harking back to an idealised, pre-Stalin version of country life in glass works and in his genre and landscape paintings.

As a young artist Chetkov experimented with Modernist themes, techniques and materials, defining his own style and visual lexicon. Upon joining the 1КДО glass factory in 1967, working with colour in glass profoundly influenced his painting, and Chetkov began to produce obsessively. He developed a rich colour palette and a glassy application style, which make his paintings 'glow' as if lit from the inside rather than from an external light source. He would also apply painterly techniques to his glass-making, feeding the two media back and forth. It was during this time that Chetkov painted the majority of his portraits.

After leaving the factory in 1979, once again due to issues with the Communist party, Chetkov went through a period of emotional difficulty in which his artistic output dramatically reduced, and his colour scheme became notably more drab. From about 1987, and accelerated by the dissolution of the Soviet Union in 1989, he exploded back into creativity, painting some 400 pieces during the early 1990s, including many Abstract works. His works from his era display a masterful use of high key tones.

From about 1995 onwards Chetkov's works in paint gained notice outside Russia. He had solo exhibitions in Germany, Russia and The US, and participated in group exhibitions in Australia, Japan and China. Most recently his posthumous solo show in the UK was also the opening exhibition of Russian Art Week 2013

Chetkov was a friend of Ernst Fuchs who admired his art glass and encouraged Chetkov to promote his paintings as Fantastic Realism. Art historian Irina G. Mikhailova considered him to be the founder member of the Saint Petersburg School of Fantastic Realism and wrote a monograph on the artist

References

20th-century Russian painters
Russian male painters
1926 births
2010 deaths
20th-century Russian male artists
Stroganov Moscow State Academy of Arts and Industry alumni